Linaria pseudolaxiflora, the Maltese toadflax, is a species of plants in the family Plantaginaceae. They are listed as vulnerable by IUCN.

Sources

References 

Endemic flora of Malta
pseudolaxiflora
Plants described in 1907
Flora of Malta